AAADC may refer to
Aromatic L-amino acid decarboxylase
American-Arab Anti-Discrimination Committee